Iota Phi Lambda Sorority Inc. is the first African American Greek-lettered business sorority established by African American business women. There are now more than 100 chapters with membership numbering more than 1300 in 85 cities and the US Virgin Islands. Iota Phi Lambda is not an National Pan Hellenic Council (NPHC) sorority and dual membership within Iota Phi Lambda Sorority and NPHC sororities is allowed.

History

The sorority was founded on June 1, 1929 in Chicago, Illinois by Lola Mercedes Parker. The founding of the sorority was important for African American women as after World War I there was the "Great Migration" of blacks from the South to the Northern cities, seeking greater opportunities and a more tolerant society. These changes underscored the need for blacks to learn new skills. These skills, in turn, would hopefully ensure a better way of life for tens of thousands of blacks that had migrated northward.

National programs

American Education Week – Members work in support of the National Education Association via its national theme to celebrate and embrace America's public schools.

Black History Month – Programs are designed to encourage youth and adults to understand the issues facing and faced by African Americans, to share ideas, reactions, and to recognize those African Americans who have historically impacted America.

Business Month – Iota's capstone programs occur throughout the month of April. Activities focus on efforts to stimulate interest in business education and to give recognition to those who have made outstanding achievements in the field of business.

National projects

Lola M. Parker Award (Outstanding Woman of the Year)

Mahala S. Evans Award (Outstanding Soror of the Year)

Career Exploration – Programs are designed to help broaden youths' awareness of and to assist in preparing them for the "world of work."

Tutorial Services – Members assist the educational system by providing remedial help for those with academic weaknesses, and work to eradicate illiteracy.

Toys U Can't Return – A Teen Pregnancy Prevention Project designed to help educate communities about teenage pregnancy and develop effective action agendas for preventing children from having children.

Iota Mothers Assistance Program (IMAP) – Program designed to provide outreach services to meet the needs of teen and disadvantaged mothers (ages 20–40)

Future Iota Leaders (FIL) are preteen and teenage girls and boys who are mentored by members of the Iota family. Programs provide socialization and development opportunities for youth leadership training, and encourage them to realize their potentials to the fullest.

Scholarships are awarded annually on the chapter, regional, and national levels.

National Presidents
The National Presidents for Iota Phi Lambda:

Lola M. Parker (1929 – 1946)
Alice P. Allen (1946 – 1950)
Jeanne S. Scott (1950 – 1954)
Marion H. Jackson (1954 – 1958)
Florence M. Hill (1958 – 1962)
Ossie W. Mitchell (1962 – 1966)
Mahala Evans (1966 – 1969)
Bessie Coston (1969  – 1973)
A. Lucille Reynolds (1973 – 1977)
Fredda Witherspoon (1977 – 1981)
Clarice E. Brown (1981 – 1983)
Evelyn S. Peevy (1983 – 1985)
Billie O. Glover Morris (1985 – 1987)
Pricilla D. Thomas (1987 – 1989)
E. Grace Payne (1989 – 1991)
Dorethea N. Hornbuckle (1991 – 1995)
Marcella Morrison (1995 – 1999)
Lillian F. Parker (1999 – 2003)
Charlotte M. Maull (2003 – 2007)
Doris Browning Austin (2007 – 2011)
Phyllis Shumate (2011 – 2015)
Stephanie N. Dilworth (2015 – 2019)
Dorothy M. White (2019 – Current)

Notable members
Mary McLeod Bethune (Honorary).
Carrie Meek (Honorary)
Donna Christian-Christensen (Honorary)
Ada Crogman Franklin (Honorary)
Edith Mai Padmore (Honorary)
Irene McCoy Gaines (Honorary)
Pearl S. Buck (Honorary)
Marian Wright Edelman (Honorary)
Hazel Garland (Honorary)
Rachel B. Noel (Honorary)
Betty Smith Williams (Honorary)
Nana Amuah Afenyi VI (Honorary)
Lydia P. Jackson (Honorary)
Mary Dee

See also

 Professional fraternities and sororities

References

Additional References
Green, E. K. (1959). A history of Iota Phi Lambda Sorority, 1929-1958. Washington, DC: Iota Phi Lambda Sorority.
Howard University, Social Work Library: Sims, S. B. (1978). A history of Iota Phi Lambda Sorority 1959-1969. [n.p.]: Iota Phi Lambda Sorority.

African-American fraternities and sororities
Student organizations established in 1929
1929 establishments in Illinois